Aleksandra Zych (born 28 July 1993) is a Polish professional handballer who plays as a right back for Măgura Cisnădie and the Polish national team.

International honours 

Championnat de France :
Winner: 2019
Polish Superliga:
Winner: 2017
Coupe de France:
Winner: 2019
Puchar Polski:
Winner: 2014, 2015, 2016 
Carpathian Trophy:
Winner: 2017

References

External links

1993 births
Living people
Polish female handball players
People from Wałbrzych
Expatriate handball players
Polish expatriate sportspeople in France
Polish expatriate sportspeople in Germany
Polish expatriate sportspeople in Romania
21st-century Polish women